Tara Singh (5 May 1931 – 18 September 2016) was a noted sculptor from Punjab, India. He was the recipient of a number of awards, including the Punjab Rattan Award, the Baba Farid Award and the Sobha Singh Memorial Award.

Life
He was born at Lakha village near Raikot in Ludhiana district on 5 May 1931.

References

1931 births
2016 deaths
Indian Sikhs
People from Ludhiana district
Punjabi people
20th-century Indian sculptors
Male artists from Punjab, India
20th-century Indian male artists